The Awful Truth is a 1937 film starring Irene Dunne and Cary Grant.

The Awful Truth may also refer to:

Films 
 The Awful Truth (1925 film), a film with Agnes Ayres and Warner Baxter
 The Awful Truth (1929 film), a film with Ina Claire and Henry Daniell

Television 
 The Awful Truth (TV series), a 1999 American program hosted by Michael Moore
 "The Awful Truth" (SATC episode), a 1999 episode of Sex and the City
 "The Awful Truth" (Alias episode), a 2005 episode of Alias

Other uses
 The Awful Truth (column), an online gossip column by Ted Casablanca
 The Awful Truth (band), an American progressive metal band
 The Awful Truth (album), the band's only album
 The Awful Truth (play), a 1922 Broadway play by Arthur Richman, basis for the films